Ero is a genus of pirate spiders first described in 1836. They resemble comb-footed spiders due to their globular abdomen, which is higher than it is long.

Description 

The upper side of their abdomen bears one or two pairs of conical tubercles and some curved bristle-like hairs. The anterior medial eyes project on small tubercles. Leg 1 is nearly twice as long as leg 4. 

Their egg sacs are uniquely shaped elongated globes, about four millimetres in diameter. They are suspended from vegetation on a silken thread, and are made from an inner layer of yellowish brown silk and an outer layer of dark coloured, loosely woven silk, giving it a "woolly" appearance. The sacs are not guarded by the female, so when the juveniles hatch, they have to fend for themselves. Since Ero species are nocturnal, the adults are not often seen and the egg sacks often reveal their presence before specimens are found.

Feeding behaviour
Spiders in this genus are specialised spider killers. They attack potential victims by biting one of its legs and injecting toxins. It quickly retreats as the prey spider becomes paralysed. When its prey is immobile, it feeds by sucking out the victim's body fluids.

Species
The World Spider Catalog lists these species:
 Ero aphana (Walckenaer, 1802) — Palearctic (St. Helena, Queensland, Western Australia, introduced)
 Ero cachinnans Brignoli, 1978 — Bhutan
 Ero cambridgei Kulczyński, 1911 — Palearctic
 Ero canala Wang, 1990 — China
 Ero canionis Chamberlin & Ivie, 1935 — USA
 Ero capensis Simon, 1895 — South Africa
 Ero catharinae Keyserling, 1886 — Brazil
 Ero comorensis Emerit, 1996 — Comoro Islands, Seychelles
 Ero eburnea Thaler, 2004 — Ivory Coast
 Ero felix Thaler & van Harten, 2004 — Yemen
 Ero flammeola Simon, 1881 — Portugal to Corfu, Canary Islands
 Ero furcata (Villers, 1789) — Palearctic
 Ero furuncula Simon, 1909 — Vietnam
 Ero galea Wang, 1990 — China
 Ero ganglia Yin & Bao, 2012 — China
 Ero gemelosi Baert & Maelfait, 1984 — Galapagos Islands
 Ero goeldii Keyserling, 1891 — Brazil
 Ero gracilis Keyserling, 1891 — Brazil
 Ero humilithorax Keyserling, 1886 — Brazil
 Ero japonica Bösenberg & Strand, 1906 — Russia, China, Korea, Japan
 Ero jiafui Yin & Bao, 2012 — China
 Ero juhuaensis Xu, Wang & Wang, 1987 — China
 Ero kompirensis Strand, 1918 — Japan
 Ero laeta Barrientos, 2017 — Portugal, Spain
 Ero lata Keyserling, 1891 — Brazil
 Ero lawrencei Unzicker, 1966 — South Africa
 Ero leonina (Hentz, 1850) — USA
 Ero lodingi Archer, 1941 — USA
 Ero lokobeana Emerit, 1996 — Madagascar
 Ero madagascariensis Emerit, 1996 — Madagascar
 Ero melanostoma Mello-Leitão, 1929 — Brazil
 Ero pensacolae Ivie & Barrows, 1935 — USA
 Ero quadrituberculata Kulczynski, 1905 — Madeira
 Ero salittana Barrion & Litsinger, 1995 — Philippines
 Ero spinifrons Mello-Leitão, 1929 — Brazil
 Ero spinipes (Nicolet, 1849) — Chile, Argentina
 Ero tenebrosa Lissner, 2018 — Canary Islands
 Ero tuberculata (De Geer, 1778) — Palearctic
 Ero valida Keyserling, 1891 — Brazil

References

External links

Mimetidae
Araneomorphae genera
Cosmopolitan spiders